The 2012 Girls' Youth NORCECA Volleyball Championship was the eighth edition of the bi-annual women's volleyball tournament, played by nine countries from August 21–26, 2012 in Managua, Nicaragua. The event served as qualifier to the 2013 Women's Junior World Championship

Competing Nations

Pool standing procedure
Match won 3–0: 5 points for the winner, 0 point for the loser
Match won 3–1: 4 points for the winner, 1 points for the loser
Match won 3–2: 3 points for the winner, 2 points for the loser
In case of tie, the teams were classified according to the following criteria:
points ratio and sets ratio

First round
 ''All times are CST, Nicaragua Standard Time (UTC -06)

Group A

Group B

Group C

Final round

Championship bracket

Classification 7th to 9th places

Quarterfinals

7th place match

Semifinals

5th place match

3rd place match

Final

Final standing

Individual awards

Most Valuable Player

Best Scorer

Best Spiker

Best Blocker

Best Server

Best Digger

Best Setter

Best Receiver

Best Libero

References

External links
 NORCECA.net

Women's NORCECA Volleyball Championship
2012 in Nicaraguan sport